Qadam is a municipality and a neighborhood in the southern part of Damascus, Syria, due west of Yarmouk Camp.

History
Prior to its urbanization and integration into Damascus municipality al-Qadam was a village on the Hajj caravan road called al-Qadam al-Sharif (the Noble Foot). It was named after a stone originally from Bosra where tradition holds an imprint was left of the foot of the Islamic prophet Muhammad when he visited the city. The stone had been relocated from Bosra to a mosque in al-Qadam.

Districts
Al-Asali (pop. 21,731)
Dahadil (pop. 14,310)
Jouret al-Shreibati (8,836)
Al-Mustafa (pop. 9,218)
Al-Qadam (pop. 18,649)
Qadam Sharqi (pop. 4,022)
Al-Sayyidah Aisha (pop. 19,178)

References

Neighborhoods of Damascus